Lu Ding Ji may refer to:

 The Deer and the Cauldron, known as Lu Ding Ji in Chinese, is a novel by Jin Yong. An alternate English translation of the title is The Duke of Mount Deer.
 Films adapted from the novel:
 Royal Tramp, a 1992 Hong Kong film
 Royal Tramp II, the sequel to Royal Tramp
 Television series adapted from the novel:
 The Duke of Mount Deer (1984 Hong Kong TV series), a 1984 Hong Kong television series
 The Duke of Mount Deer (1984 Taiwanese TV series), a 1984 Taiwanese television series
 The Duke of Mount Deer (1998 TV series), a 1998 Hong Kong television series
 The Duke of Mount Deer (2000 TV series), a 2000 television series
 Royal Tramp (TV series), a 2008 Chinese television series